MTV Sports: T.J. Lavin's Ultimate BMX is a sports video game published by THQ for Game Boy Color in 2000, and for PlayStation in 2001. It features BMX rider T.J. Lavin on the cover.

Reception

The PlayStation version received "generally unfavorable reviews" according to the review aggregation website Metacritic.

References

External links
 
 

2000 video games
BMX mass media
BMX video games
Cycling video games
Game Boy Color games
MTV video games
PlayStation (console) games
THQ games
Video games based on real people
Video games developed in the United States